The Serbian First League (Serbian: Prva liga Srbije) is the second-highest football league in Serbia. The league is operated by the Serbian FA. 16 teams compete in the league for the 2015–16 season. Two teams were promoted to the Serbian SuperLiga. Four teams were relegated to the Serbian League, the third-highest division overall in the Serbian football league system. The season begun in August 2015 and ended in May 2016.

2015–16 teams

League table

Results

Top goalscorers
Source: Prva liga official website

Hat-tricks

Note
4 Player scored 4 goals

References

External links
 Official website

Serbian First League seasons
2015–16 in Serbian football leagues
Serbia